The New South Wales men's cricket team (formerly named NSW Blues) are an Australian men's professional first class cricket team based in Sydney, New South Wales. The team competes in the Australian first class cricket competition known as the Sheffield Shield and the limited overs Marsh One-Day Cup. The team previously played in the now defunct Twenty20, Big Bash, which has since been replaced by the Big Bash League since the 2011–12 season. New South Wales were the inaugural winners of the Champions League Twenty20.

They are the most successful domestic cricket side in Australia having won the First-class competition 47 times. In addition, they have also won the Australian domestic limited-overs cricket tournament cup 11 times. They occasionally play first-class matches against touring International sides. New South Wales have played teams representing nine of the twelve test playing nations. Besides its domestic successes, the state is also known for producing some of the finest Australian cricketers to have graced the game.

Colours and badge

The primary club colour of New South Wales is sky blue, which represents the state colour of New South Wales. The secondary club colour is dark blue, with additional contrasting colour of white.

Shirt sponsors and manufacturers

Squad
Players with international caps are listed in bold.

The squad for the 2022/23 season is as follows:

Notable players

The following is a list of notable players who have represented Australia in Test Matches.

    Don Bradman
    Steve Waugh
    Mark Waugh
    Michael Bevan
    Adam Gilchrist
    Stuart MacGill
    Glenn McGrath
    Michael Slater
    Geoff Lawson
    Doug Walters
    Victor Trumper
    Tibby Cotter
    Bill O'Reilly
    Fred Spofforth
    Ray Lindwall
    Arthur Morris
    Neil Harvey
    Allan Border
    Alan Davidson
    Bob Simpson
    Monty Noble
    Stan McCabe
    Charlie Macartney
    Richie Benaud
    Mark Taylor
    Syd Gregory
    Norm O'Neill
    Warren Bardsley
    Arthur Mailey
    Brian Booth
    Ian Craig
    Sid Barnes
    Bill Brown
    Jack Gregory
    Sammy Carter
    Charles Kelleway
    Jim Kelly
    Charles Turner
    Percy McDonnell
    George Bonnor
    Alick Bannerman
    Dave Gregory
    Nathan Bracken
    Stuart Clark
    Brett Lee
    Simon Katich
    Michael Clarke
    Doug Bollinger
    Nathan Hauritz
    Brad Haddin
    Phillip Hughes
    David Warner
    Phil Jaques
    Harry Moses
    Steve Smith
    Mitchell Starc
    Usman Khawaja
    Shane Watson
    Stephen O'Keefe
    Beau Casson
    Moises Henriques
    Pat Cummins
    Josh Hazlewood
    Nathan Lyon
    Trent Copeland
    Kurtis Patterson
    Peter Nevill
    Nic Maddinson

The following is a list of players who have represented other nations in Test matches.

    Mason Crane
    Imran Khan

Honours

Sheffield Shield/Pura Cup Champions: 47
 1895–96, 1896–97, 1899–1900, 1901–02, 1902–03, 1903–04, 1904–05, 1905–06, 1906–07, 1908–09, 1910–11, 1911–12, 1913–14, 1919–20, 1920–21, 1922–23, 1925–26, 1928–29, 1931–32, 1932–33, 1937–38, 1939–40, 1948–49, 1949–50, 1951–52, 1953–54, 1954–55, 1955–56, 1956–57, 1957–58, 1958–59, 1959–60, 1960–61, 1961–62, 1964–65, 1965–66, 1982–83, 1984–85, 1985–86, 1989–90, 1992–93, 1993–94, 2002–03, 2004–05, 2007–08, 2013–14, 2019–20

Sheffield Shield/Pura Cup Runner-up (since introduction of final in 1982–83): 4
 1990–91, 1991–92, 2006–07, 2018-19

Domestic One-Day Cup Champions: 12
 1984–85, 1987–88, 1991–92, 1992–93, 1993–94, 2000–01, 2001–02, 2002–03, 2005–06, 2015-16, 2016-17, 2020-21

Domestic One-Day Cup Runner-up: 9
 1979–80, 1981–82, 1982–83, 1990–91, 1997–98, 1998–99, 2013–14, 2014–15, 2021-22

KFC Twenty20 Big Bash Champions: 1
 2008–09

Champions League Twenty20 Champions: 1
 2009

Records

Most first-class matches played

Most first-class runs

Most first-class wickets

See also

Cricket in New South Wales
New South Wales Cricket Association
Sydney Grade Cricket

References

External links
Official Website of the New South Wales cricket team
Official Website of Cricket Australia

Australian first-class cricket teams
Cricket in New South Wales
Bl
Cricket clubs established in 1856
Sports teams in Sydney